RLJ Entertainment (formerly Image Entertainment) is an American film production company and home video distributor, distributing film and television productions in North America, with approximately 3,200 exclusive DVD titles and approximately 340 exclusive CD titles in domestic release, and approximately 450 programs internationally via sublicense agreements. For many of its titles, Image has exclusive audio and broadcast rights as well as digital download rights to approximately 2,100 video programs and over 400 audio programs containing more than 6,000 tracks. The company is headquartered in Chatsworth, California.

History 

Founded in 1981 as a public company known as Image Entertainment, Image began as a distributor of LaserDiscs, whose sound and picture quality surpassed that of VHS and Beta, the dominant tape formats of the time. Image successfully secured exclusive output deals with major studios such as Universal Studios, 20th Century Fox, Orion Pictures, and The Walt Disney Company, and grew to become the dominant distributor of the format.

In August 1994, Image entered the CD-ROM market, releasing movies on the CD-ROM format.

As the 1990s came to a close and Laserdiscs gave way to DVDs, Image re-focused on the fledgling format that quickly came to dominate the home video marketplace. While studios were busy managing the transition from VHS to DVD, Image began to acquire DVD rights to long-form music concert programs, television programming, foreign films and a broad array of special interest programming from GRB Entertainment, 20th Television/Foxstar Productions, Orion Pictures, Playboy Home Entertainment and Universal Pictures, all of which were being ignored by the major studios and music labels.

In 2005, Image signed a distribution deal with Bandai Visual to distribute select anime titles under the Honneamise label. The deal ended in March 2007, when Bandai Visual switched over to Geneon USA.

Image continued to work with its long-term partner, Criterion Collection, as well as hundreds of independent content producers and rights holders to bring products to the marketplace. By the 10th anniversary of the DVD, Image has once again established itself as a dominant distributor of independently produced programs. In 2008, Image began to expand its release schedule to include feature films.

On August 31, 2010, Sony Pictures Home Entertainment partnered with Image Entertainment in a multi-year agreement, marketing and distributing some DVDs and Blu-rays by Image. Image retains its own sales and marketing. The deal was expired in April 2012, when Mill Creek Entertainment agreed to release the most of Sony Pictures libraries. On April 27, 2011, Image Entertainment made a long-term agreement with Lakeshore Entertainment to distribute their film library on home media. This also gave them access to the New World Pictures library which Lakeshore acquired in 1996, with many of the titles not issued on Blu-ray at the time.
On April 2, 2012, it was announced that RLJ Acquisition, Inc. had entered into an agreement to acquire Image Entertainment as well as Acorn Media and plan to merge the two companies. The two companies operate under the banner "RLJ Entertainment". The company was then renamed RLJ Entertainment. In 2014, RLJ acquired British media distributor Acorn Media UK, this deal also included 64% in Agatha Christie Limited.

On July 30, 2018, AMC Networks reached a definitive agreement to acquire RLJ Entertainment where AMC would pay $59 million for the remaining RLJE shares not owned by AMC or Robert L. Johnson. The transaction was approved by RLJ Entertainment's stockholders on October 31, and AMC Networks completed the acquisition on November 1. RLJ Entertainment became a privately owned subsidiary of AMC Networks, with Johnson and his affiliates owning a 17% stake.

Selected releases

Feature films

2010s

2020s

Other releases

Sony Pictures/20th Television releases

Special interest 
 The Criterion Collection
 IMAX programming

Television series

Stand-up comedy

Music programs

Notes

External links 
 

 
Home video companies established in 1981
Home video companies of the United States
Film production companies of the United States
Film distributors of the United States
Companies based in Calabasas, California
AMC Networks
1981 establishments in California
Companies formerly listed on the Nasdaq
Entertainment companies based in California
2018 mergers and acquisitions